Baron Gyllenhaal af Härlingstorp, is a title in the Swedish nobility. It was created in 1843 for Lars Herman Gyllenhaal, a member of the Gyllenhaal family. He was the sixth Swedish Prime Minister for Justice.

History 
There was also a hereditary title of solely Baron Gyllenhaal in the Swedish nobility, which was created in 1837 for Carl Henrik Gyllenhaal, that went extinct in 1910.

Barons Gyllenhaal af Härlingstorp 

 Lars Herman Gyllenhaal af Härlingstorp (1790–1858)
 Lars Herman Gyllenhaal af Härlingstorp (1821–1912)
 Lars Herman Gyllenhaal af Härlingstorp (1865–)

References 

Gyllenhaal family
Noble titles created in 1843